INSAT-3DR is an Indian weather satellite built by the Indian Space Research Organisation and operated by the Indian National Satellite System. It will provide meteorological services to India using a 6-channel imager and a 19-channel sounder, as well as search and rescue information and message relay for terrestrial data collection platforms. The satellite was launched on 8 September 2016, and is a follow-up to INSAT-3D.

Satellite payload

Launch

INSAT-3DR was successfully launched on 8 September 2016 at 11:20 UTC aboard a Geosynchronous Satellite Launch Vehicle (GSLV Mk II) from the Satish Dhawan Space Centre, which was delayed from 28 August. The rocket placed it into a geostationary transfer orbit for eventual stationing in geosynchronous orbit at 74° E.

References

External links

 INSAT-3DR by the Meteorological & Oceanographic Satellite Data Archival Centre
 INSAT-3DR  by the Indian Space Research Organisation
 INSAT-3DR by the National Satellite Meteorological Centre

Earth observation satellites of India
Weather satellites of India
Spacecraft launched by India in 2016
Spacecraft launched by GSLV rockets